« Qui? » or « Mais qui? » (english: Who? / But who?) is an antisemitic French internet meme that appeared on the Internet in 2021, and was later used as a slogan on placards at some demonstrations in France. One of the first « Mais qui ? » placards was held up in an August 2021 demonstration in Metz, France, by Cassandre Fristot, who was later sentenced to a six-month suspended prison term later, convicted of incitement to racial hatred. Following this other placards appeared at demonstrations: « Mais qui ? Je suis Cassandre. » The fundamentalist movement Civitas invited demonstrators to march with "Mais qui?" placards. The meme was widely used worldwide on discussion forums hosting politically incorrect content, such as 4chan.

In the form of a question whose answer is not known, this deceptively innocent question uses the rhetorical device of the ellipsis. Without always saying it openly, it accuses the Jews while refraining from naming them. In France, incitement to hatred is punishable by law. However, by refraining from specifically mentioning the Jews, this method of inciting hatred towards the Jewish people could theoretically escape punishment. Whether or not it is accompanied by names or portraits of supposedly Jewish personalities, the "Mais qui ... " usually implies a sequence such as "...rules the world?", "...manipulates or own the media?" or "...is at the origin of or profits from the COVID-19 pandemic?". «Mais qui?» is a variant of the Jewish conspiracy theory.

Origins 

Marc Knobel, a specialist in racist and antisemitic propaganda on the Internet, notes that "things started well before the appearance of the slogan "Qui?", a classic strategy of the far right to designate a scapegoat without naming him or her head-on ... From the beginning of the pandemic, there was some trash talk on certain platforms targeting Agnès Buzyn..., Yves Levy, or... Jérôme Salomon. Then these accusations were extended to Jews as a whole".

The first occurrence of the expression "Who?" with antisemitic undertones was on 18 June 2021, during a duplex interview on the french television channel CNews. Retired General Dominique Delawarde (signatory of the controversial "tribune des généraux" in the far-right newspaper Valeurs Actuelles) referred to a minority controlling the "media hound". To make this more explicit, the columnist Claude Posternak (member of La République en marche and president of the opinion agency "La Matrice") insisted on asking for greater clarity: "Who? but say who?", Dominique Delawarde replied: "The community that you know well". The host, Jean-Marc Morandini, then interrupted the interview. Shortly afterwards, the Paris public prosecutor's office opened an investigation against the former military officer for "public defamation and incitement to hatred and violence on the grounds of origin or belonging to an ethnic group, nation, race or religion"; in November 2020, Delawarde had already mentioned on a blog, with regard to "the hypothesis of major fraud" in the American presidential election, "the Western 'media pack', which we know who controls it".

Sentence meaning and development

Decoding the meaning of "Mais Qui?" 

Various French commentators offered interpretations of the usage of the phrase. According to Rudy Reichstadt, political scientist and director of Conspiracy Watch, the usage of the phrase is antisemitic language trying to dodge "quite clumsily, the reproach of antisemitism". Reichstadt mentioned that since the end of 2018 and the Yellow Vests protests, that accusations of conspiracy have become commonplace on the web, taking the form of antisemitic slogans that denounce, for some, a "dictatorship" that would prevail in a "totalitarian regime" in France. The historian Tal Bruttmann also notes that "the Internet has broken the shackles on the public expression of antisemitism."

Dominique Sopo, President of SOS Racisme, stated that "there is no doubt about the meaning of this placard". He also believes that "the question ≈ is a falsely coded question that refers to the accusation that the Jews are an evil community and the cause of all our ills"; he also sees this as an attempt by the far right to lead this new protest movement. Lawyer Patrick Klugman considers that "Mais qui?" becomes a rallying sign for people who want to target the Jewish community as an overpowering community whose interests are hidden and different from the rest of society".

The sociologist Michel Wieviorka considers that this "seemingly innocent pronoun that actually targets 'the Jews'... accuses them of benefiting from the health crisis". For the historian Marc Knobel, "The message, stigmatizing, is simple. Who are the ones responsible for the pandemic, and who would benefit from all this? The Jews".

Political scientist Jean-Yves Camus reads in the subtext of the question: "Who is trying to make people believe that a pandemic exists and to take advantage of this 'lie' to enact exceptional health measures in terms of public freedoms? This question "suggests a malignant intention born in the brain of a group of individuals who are attributed such power that, in concert, they would pursue a hidden plan of domination, the pass of which would be only a step towards a world government of a dictatorial nature".

The formulation of this question, without naming the Jews, also implies that it would be forbidden to do so (e.g. Rudy Reichstadt refers to the fact that Raphaël Confiant, in defense of Dieudonné, described the Jews as "unspeakable" in 2006), while "this taboo exists only in the paranoid worldview of antisemites".

Dissemination 

"Mais Qui?" became a meme on the Internet, notably on the French video game forum Jeuxvideo.com, and internationally on 4chan. It also found root among antisemitic groups, such as the neonazi website The Daily Stormer, supporters of Alain Soral or Dieudonné, as well as activists focused on the 2019 Covid crisis. The antisemitic website Jesuispartout.com, created in 2020, along with an associated Telegram channel, positioning Jewish or supposedly Jewish personalities on an interactive map; Minister Gérald Darmanin announced on Twitter that he would take the site to court, calling it "deeply scandalous and nauseating".  The founder of the site, Samuel Goujon, was indicted on 21 August 2021.

A few weeks after the interview with General Delawarde, some anti-sanitary pass demonstrators march with Mais qui? on their placards. These were especially visible at the rallies organized by Florian Philippot on 17, 24, and 31 July. They join the various visuals that have already caused a scandal during the rallies, mixing yellow stars, references to the Vichy regime or to Nazism. Sometimes in a paradoxical way, in an "absolute contradiction", points out Michel Wievioka. "With all these references, we have an illustration of the specificity of antisemitism", explains the historian Emmanuel Debono. Interviewed by a far-right Youtube channel, several participants of a demonstration, carrying the sign "Who?", then unfolded antisemitic clichés or allegations, evoking "well-poisoners", "greed"...

On 7 August 2021, this slogan was used on a sign in a demonstration against the health pass in Metz. The sign asks questions in red and then answers directly by naming thirteen names of families or personalities supposedly Jewish or allegedly "accomplices of the Jews"  in black. These are politicians, intellectuals or economists, some of whom have no connection with the pandemic or the vaccine policy, but many of whom have in common a real or supposed membership of the Jewish community. The names Rothschild, B.H.L., Attali, Soros, Drahi, etc. are all "recurrent targets of antisemitic propaganda for years - and, in the case of the Rothschilds, since the 19th century ". All these personalities are described as "Traitors!!!" in white, and the letter Q (from "Who?") is surmounted by black demonising horns, "emblematic of anti-Jewish passion ".

The person holding up the placard, Cassandre Fristot, is a part-time German teacher in Moselle and was a member of the Front National, briefly head of Louis Aliot's cabinet and a candidate in the 2020 municipal elections, then close to the Parti de la France. She was placed in police custody two days later and suspended from her duties pending "disciplinary action "26. On 10 August, the Metz public prosecutor announced a trial for "public incitement to racial hatred", scheduled for 8 September. During her hearings in police custody, the teacher stated that she did not understand what she was accused of doing: she said that she had been inspired by a model found on the Internet to denounce the health policy carried out by the executive, whose health pass, through "the powerful, and not to undermine a community". Regarding the flag she holds in her other hand, which reads "Sacred heart of Jesus, hope and salvation of France", she replies that "Despite the fleur-de-lis, even if it may allude to a royalist flag, it is above all a message of peace. In her case, she was defended by Paul Yon, former lawyer for the Holocaust denier Robert Faurisson, and François Wagner. She was tried by the Metz criminal court on 8 September 2021, where she did not appear at the hearing. The prosecutor requested a three-month suspended prison sentence, while the defendant's lawyers pleaded for acquittal. The court reserved judgment until 20 October 2021. Finally, Cassandre Fristot was sentenced by the Metz Criminal Court to a six-month suspended prison sentence and ordered to pay sums ranging from 1 to 300 euros to anti-racist associations.

After the posting of the sign in Metz, the journalist Éric Naulleau considered that through this "casual antisemitism in which nothing is missing, [...] in the name of the fight against the health pass; ... the foul beast knows how to vary the masks".

On Saturdays 14 and 20 August, demonstrations in French cities against the health pass continued to be peppered with provocative slogans, comparisons with Nazi horrors or signs of antisemitism and support for Cassandre Fristot, including more "Who?" signs showing the faces of Jacques Attali and Claude Posternak or lists of names. Among the demonstrators, Eloi Fauvergue, who had displayed on his bob and torso the inscription "Qui? with the "Q" also topped with horns here, and carrying a royalist flag on his shoulders during the demonstration of 14 August in Compiègne, was sentenced in January 2022 to a three month suspended prison sentence by the criminal court for "public provocation to hatred or violence" towards the Jewish community. The defendant explained: "My aim was to support Cassandre Fristot for her courage to demonstrate. There was no interpretation. I was supporting freedom of expression. I found it beautiful and original to put horns on the Q of the Who", but Marie-Céline Lawrysz, the public prosecutor, pointed instead to "a perfidious racism that feeds on good feelings".

While the antisemitic character of this slogan is unambiguous ("there is not much more antisemitic than this sign "), Rudy Reichstadt acknowledges the ignorance of some people about it, but the sign "provides, as in a game of Cluedo, a certain number of clues, leaving them to connect the dots by themselves ".

The essayist Tristan Mendès-France considers that these marches "are suitcase demonstrations, organized behind vague terms, which allow communities that have nothing to do with each other to agglomerate"; "There is an extreme heterogeneity of social profiles, many people who have a whole series of grievances that accumulate".

Yet, despite reactions against antisemitism, other demonstrators saw the controversy as a way to divert attention and discredit their movement. For Rudy Reichstadt, it is about minimising antisemitism, and for others trivialising it.

Recurrence and passiveness 

Dominique Sopo is struck by "the recurrent and assumed nature of things... From now on, the sign bearers do not hide and there is an absence of reaction from other demonstrators. Now the sign bearers do not hide, and there is an absence of reaction from the other demonstrators". Yet the slogan "Who?" and its antisemitic meaning were widely publicised".

Michel Wieviorka also notes this visibility, which is a novelty through this "resurgence of antisemitism": "In these anti-sanitary pass demonstrations,... antisemitism is inserted in a way that is not complicated within the crowd itself and... no one tries to distance themselves from it or to denounce it". Even if not all the demonstrators are antisemitic, this expression "finds its space... and is not immediately, strongly rejected by all those around".

Simplification and fantasy 

In 2005, the European Union Agency for Fundamental Rights considered antisemitism to be "accusing Jews of conspiring to harm humanity and blaming Jews 'for things that go wrong'. This can be expressed in speech, writing, visual forms or actions, and uses sinister stereotypes and negative character traits". If the criticism uses metaphors, images, rhetoric that implies that Israelis or Jews are evil, it is again the projection of the accusation of ritual murder. An example is the allegation about Jews as such or about Jewish power, the myth of the Jewish conspiracy on the world, or that Jews control the media, the economy, the government or other societal institutions.

The sociologist Michel Wieviorka explains that the antisemitism of the anti-sanitary pass demonstrations is "a little bit... of the ultra-left" but mainly "that of the far right... with an enormous historical depth", which is regularly found according to historical contexts; "It resurrects, but its features evolve ". "The health crisis - as is often the case in the history of crises - is a breeding ground for the expression of this antisemitism"; "... from the Middle Ages to the Covid, the Jews are traditional scapegoats..., they were accused of poisoning the wells... This is the first time in a very long time that there was a need for scapegoats in our society... In these demonstrations where conspiracy theories cloud the minds of some demonstrators, this archaic antisemitism resurfaces". In these demonstrations, where conspiracy theories cloud the minds of some demonstrators, this archaic antisemitism resurfaces "15. "The myth of the Jewish conspiracy, in particular, comes back regularly during pandemics because it offers a rational explanation for anguish" and its scapegoat "is regularly embodied in the figure of the Jew", observes the historian, political scientist and director of research at the CNRS (National Centre for Scientific Research), Nonna Mayer.

The historian Marc Knobel considers that "With its share of uncertainties and fears, the epidemic has also been instrumentalized for antisemitic purposes". For the historian Emmanuel Debono, "in moments of crisis, movements that bring together fairly heterogeneous fringes of the population such as the Yellow Vests, there is a focus, at one point or another, on the Jews". However, Wieviorka specifies that the antisemitism of the Yellow Vests is "secondary episodes, on the fringes, rather distinct from the message carried by the movement as a whole".

For the microbiologist, member of the WHO and professor emeritus Jean-Pierre Dedet, "the search for someone to blame has been a constant in civilisations faced with a health crisis", who most often pointed to immigrants and Jews. "We can understand these archaic reflexes at a time when epidemics were plagues of mysterious origin... Today, we know the causes and the processes. It is paradoxical, at a time when technology and communication are at their highest level, that people continue to react irrationally. For him, "there is a lack of knowledge and scientific culture" and "the cacophony of the medical world" adds to the misunderstanding.

The focus on the Jews is "a reading that simplifies the functioning of a complex world whose ins and outs we do not necessarily understand...", explains Debono; as if Hitler's antisemitism, said to be over, had today given way to other victims (Yellow Vests, Muslims, non-vaccinated against Covid-19...) calling for a mobilization against a new persecution. The yellow star would have gone out of history and changed its chest", Debono says, adding that "the Jews are where we need them to be, even when they are not there". "The fantasy of Jewish omnipresence, which explains everything and its opposite, is difficult if not impossible to extinguish. It functions wonderfully, even in the absence of the Jews. In fact, it functions outside of reality".

Attitude 

Wieviorka fears that "without a clear refusal on the part of each demonstrator and of those who urge the crowd to express this type of hatred within the processions, it is to be feared that its presence will be reinforced". The sociologist concludes: "Under no circumstances should we have anything to do with this hatred, we should be surgical in the way we denounce it. I would even say that indifference on this issue is unacceptable" because it is neither anecdotal nor secondary.

At the beginning of September 2021, Laurent Berger, Secretary General of the CFDT, described as "infrequent (...) all those who are far-right, who are conspiracy theorists, who are anti-Semites and who, in the end, use this argument to push their ideas", and did not wish to be assimilated to these demonstrators against the health pass.

Notes

References 

Antisemitism in France